Lionel is a village in the Ness area of the Isle of Lewis. Lionel is within the parish of Barvas. Lionel is situated near the northern end of the A857, at the junctions with the B8013 to Eoropie and the B8015 to Eorodale and Skigersta.

See also 

 Lewis and Harris
 History of the Outer Hebrides

References

External links 

 Visitor's guide for the Isle of Lewis
 Website of the Western Isles Council with links to other resources
 Disabled access to Lewis for residents and visitors
 
 A Guide to living in the Outer Hebrides, with most information pertaining to Lewis

Villages in the Isle of Lewis